The Union Party' ("Dashink" kusaktsutiun) was a political party in Armenia.

History
Following the 2007 Armenian parliamentary elections, the party did not win any seats in the National Assembly with a popular vote of 2.44%. The party has not participated in any subsequent elections and has since dissolved.

See also

Politics of Armenia
Programs of political parties in Armenia

Political parties in Armenia
Political parties with year of establishment missing